WTHU (1450 AM) is an oldies formatted broadcast radio station licensed to Thurmont, Maryland, serving Northern Frederick County, Maryland.  WTHU is owned and operated by Christian Radio Coalition, Inc.

References

External links
Cool 1450 AM Online

1967 establishments in Maryland
Adult standards radio stations in the United States
Oldies radio stations in the United States
Radio stations established in 1967
THU